Getronics is a Dutch-headquartered ICT services business, founded in 1887 and today employing approximately 4,000 employees across Europe, Asia Pacific, and Latin America. Getronics has over 2000 customers, including Credit Agricole, Intersnack, and Inditex, as well as Ford Motors, which the company has served for over 35 years. Getronics is also founding member of the Global Workspace Alliance, a consortium of leading local IT companies delivering IT services in over 180 countries.

In July 2020, GSH Private Capital acquired the business in a deal worth €200M led by Kenton Fine, Chairman and CEO of Getronics.

History

Founding
In 1887, the company was created as N.V. Groeneveld, van der Poll & Co's Electrotechnische Fabriek Amsterdam (GVPC). The enterprise was involved with electrical installations, such as the monitoring and control of public facilities and shipping.

Name changes
After the World War II GVPC set up a technical sales office Groenpol as a separate entity. In 1950, the holding company GVPC changed its name to Groenpol NV, and in 1965 the distribution division became Groenpol Industrial Sales. In 1968, Groenpol NV merged with another listed company, Geveke SA. The new name was Geveke & Groenpol NV. In 1970, SHV brought the holding company.

In 1972, Groenpol Industrial Sales made a partial takeover of the technical trading Merchant & Co, the company started sales and service of computer peripherals. Meanwhile, the company also had offices in Belgium, France and Germany. In the same year the name was changed to Geveke Electronics. In 1985  the company was introduced on the Amsterdam stock exchange.

In 1988, its name changed to Getronics NV. Getronics was traded by the AMX index abbreviation 23dGET. The main focus of the company became computer networking and maintenance.

Acquisition Trail 
In 1999, Getronics acquired Wang Global (who had recently acquired Olsy, the service arm of Olivetti) for 3.7 billion guilders (approximately 1.8 billion Euros). Wang Global, based in the United States, was active in 42 countries, which made Getronics a global player. This was strategically advantageous for working with Getronics' international customers.

PinkRoccade acquisition 
PinkRoccade was founded as Roccade (RCC) in 1950 providing punched card services for the Dutch Ministry of the Interior. In 1993, RCC took over Bouwfonds Informatica and merged with Pink Elephant and becoming PinkRoccade. In 2003, PinkRoccade had 8700 employees. After two rounds of redundancies the number was reduced to 7,000 (a thousand of which were based in the United Kingdom).

In 2005, before the acquisition by Getronics, the Dutch State had an interest of 25.8% in PinkRoccade. On March 14, Getronics completed the acquisition of PinkRoccade. Getronics paid a total of €355 million in cash. With the acquisition, it became the largest IT service company in the Netherlands under the name Getronics PinkRoccade.

On October 13, 2008, the name was shortened from Getronics PinkRoccade to Getronics. On June 29, 2005, a stock exchange reverse stock split of 7 to 1 took place.

In early 2007, Getronics had approximately 24,000 employees in more than 25 countries. Around the beginning of July 2007 several companies started to look into taking over Getronics including KPN, Capgemini and an unnamed American private equity firm. On July 30, KPN made a bid of 766 million euros. The acquisition of Getronics was confirmed on October 15, 2007 by KPN. Getronics was no longer listed on Euronext after December 12, 2007.

KPN ownership (2007–2012) 
In June 2008, Getronics announced that its US operations (formerly Wang) to CompuCom for cash and a minority stake in CompuCom. These activities include operations in Canada the United States and in Mexico.

On December 1, 2008 the sale of the business unit Business Application Services (BAS) was completed at Capgemini. The sale included 2,300 employees and customer base of BAS. Capgemini paid 255 million euros. Business Solutions, the last remaining unsold part of Business Application Services (BAS), consisting of 800 employees who were engaged in local government and healthcare sector found refuge with Total Specific Solutions which had previously Everest in the year taken from Getronics.

The part that dealt Microsoft and .NET development came into the hands of Delaware Consultancy.

On March 31, 2009, the parent company announced a shrinkage of staff to 1,400 employees.

On June 17, 2011, Getronics CEO announced a further contraction of 2,500 jobs. Partly by offshoring, but also because disappointing results made it necessary that there should occur a reduction of jobs in the Netherlands within 18 months. On August 30, 2011, it was announced that 400 underperforming employees would lose their positions.

Aurelius acquisition (2012-2017) 
In 2012, KPN sold a majority stake of Getronics Europe and APAC to the Aurelius Group, a German publicly listed industrial holding company. KPN sold Getronics LATAM businesses to OpenGate Capital, a global private equity firm.

The Dutch activities of Getronics remained with KPN, first under the name KPN Corporate Market, and from January 1, 2013 under the name KPN IT Solutions'''. For international business the name Getronics has remained in place.

In June 2015, the remaining share KPN owned in Getronics Europe and APAC was sold to the Aurelius Group. In November, Getronics won a five-year IT services contract from automotive services company RAC Limited.

Under AURELIUS’ wing, between 2012 and 2017, the Getronics Group expanded from both a geographical and a portfolio perspective through several new acquisitions, including NEC's UCC business in the UK and Spain (2013); IT consulting companies, Steria Iberica in Spain and Telvent in Spain and South America (2014); and Colt's European managed cloud business, coinciding with the launch of Getronics’ Managed Cloud Services portfolio (2016).  had also acquired Thales in Spain and Argentina, which was rebranded Connectis and became part of the Getronics Group.

 2016 – June 2020 
In 2017, Getronics Group (with both Connectis and Getronics brands) was acquired by strategic investor Bottega InvestCo S.à r.l. The majority shareholder of Bottega is the US/Brazilian entrepreneur Nana Baffour, who operates in the IT services market through Grupo Cimcorp in Brazil; prestigious financing partners include White Oak Global Advisors, Permira PDM and H.I.G. WhiteHorse.

In 2018, the Getronics Group announced its expansion to North America after acquiring U.S. based company, Pomeroy. The acquisition of Pomeroy was supported by a US$815 million financing and recapitalization transaction.July 2020 – present'''

On 21 July 2020, GSH Private Capital, led by Kenton Fine, became the new owner-managers of Dutch headquartered IT services business, in a deal worth €200M. The business has annual revenues of circa €300M. Its 4000 strong team serves over 2000 customers globally.

At the time of the acquisition, its blue chip clients included RAC, Ford, and Inditex.

Under the new ownership, the company remains focused on delivering IT services and solutions with focus on user experience, including digital workplace, cloud services, applications, smart buildings, IT support and cybersecurity.

Board chairpersons 
 1983 – 1999 – Ton Risseeuw
 1999 – 2001 – Cees van Luijk RA (from PricewaterhouseCoopers)
 2001 – 2003 – Peter van Voorst (since 1986, Peter van Voorst part of Getronics' board of directors)
 2003 – 2007 – Klaas Wagenaar (include CFO software company Baan)
 2007 – 2011 – Erik van der Meijden (from HP, appointed by KPN)
 2011 – September 30, 2013 – Steven Schilfgaarde (former CFO Getronics Erik van der Meijden coming from KPN)
 2012-2013 - Andreas Ziegenhein 
 2013- 2017 Mark Cook
 2017 - 2019 Nana Baffour
 2020 - today Kenton Fine

Kenton Fine 
Since July 2020, Kenton is Chairman & CEO of Getronics. He has been a successful entrepreneur in the services sector with over 30 years’ experience in the global facility management and services industry having founded his first business in the waste management sector in 1989.

Previously group chairman at Servest, Kenton built the Servest Group into a leading FM provider across Africa and the UK and to ultimately become the global services giant

, Atalian Servest.

Global Workspace Alliance 
Global Workspace Alliance is a jointly managed IT services consortium. Founded and led by Getronics, members include along CompuCom, Pomeroy, SPIE, Indra, AGCN, Centric, InfoCare, S&T, Eire Systems, NSC and Topnew Info. Global Workspace Alliance 2.0 was launched in April 2016 with a further commitment of joint innovation and sharing of IP between partners. Together, the Alliance Partners deliver digital workplace services in more than 180 countries, offering one single point of ownership, billing entity, end to end visibility and accountability for the services it delivers.

PinkRoccade legacy 
PinkRoccade was the first in the Netherlands to use the management method Information Technology Infrastructure Library. In 2001. the company developed the method ASL as a method of managing applications ('model Looijen'). This method is now being further developed under the by the ASL BiSL foundation.

The name PinkRoccade has returned to the company PinkRoccade Local Government ( 's-Hertogenbosch) and PinkRoccade Healthcare (Apeldoorn) which were taken over by Total Specific Solutions (TSS) KPN / Getronics in 2009.

References

Companies based in Amsterdam
IT service management
Information technology companies of the Netherlands
Dutch brands
Dutch companies established in 1887
Manufacturing companies established in 1886